Domenico Modugno (9 January 1928 – 6 August 1994) was an Italian singer, actor and, later in life, a member of the Italian Parliament. He is known for his 1958 international hit song "Nel blu dipinto di blu", for which he received Grammy Awards for Record of the Year and Song of the Year. He is considered the first Italian cantautore.

Early life 
The youngest of four children, Modugno was born at Polignano a Mare, in the province of Bari (Apulia), on 9 January 1928. His father, Vito Cosimo Modugno, was a municipal police commander, while his mother, Pasqua Lorusso, was a housewife.

At the age of 9, his family moved to San Pietro Vernotico, in the Province of Brindisi, where his father was transferred for a new job position. Here Domenico attended primary school and learned San Pietro Vernotico's dialect, which belongs to the linguistic area of Salentino dialect, similar to Sicilian. He attended secondary school in Lecce.

Career 

While still studying, Modugno had a role in a cinematographic version of Filumena Marturano by Eduardo De Filippo as well as some other films. In 1957, his song "Lazzarella", sung by Aurelio Fierro, came second in the Festival della Canzone Napoletana, bringing him his first taste of popularity.

In 1958, Modugno took part in Antonio Aniante's comedy La Rosa di Zolfo at the Festival della Prosa in Venice. Also in 1958, he discovered the Italian comedy duo of Franco and Ciccio, became their manager and got them into a long running film career. The turning point of his career came in that year, when he also participated in the Sanremo Music Festival, presenting, together with Johnny Dorelli, the song "Nel blu dipinto di blu." Co-authored by Modugno and Franco Migliacci, the song won the contest and became an enormous success worldwide.  It received two Grammy Awards with sales above 22 million copies, and represented Italy in the 1958 Eurovision Song Contest, where it came in third.

Modugno reportedly used the money gained with "Nel blu dipinto di blu" to purchase a Ferrari, however, his car was totaled in an accident, which included his fenders being smashed. This was mentioned in the Allan Sherman song "America's a nice Italian Name."

In 1959, Modugno won the Sanremo Music Festival for the second time in a row, with "Piove" (also known as "Ciao, ciao bambina"), and received second place in 1960 with "Libero." This was a successful period of time for Modugno who again represented Italy in the Eurovision Song Contest of 1959. Later his hit song "Io" was sung by Elvis Presley in English with the title "Ask Me."

In 1962, Modugno won the Sanremo Music Festival a third time with "Addio..., addio...."  Four years later, he again represented Italy at Eurovision with "Dio, come ti amo." Sergio Franchi recorded it in Italian (titled "Oh How Much I Love You (Dio, come ti amo!)) on his 1967 RCA Victor album, From Sergio-with Love. Jack Jones recorded it in English for his 1967 album, Our Song, under the title "Oh How Much I Love You."Shirley Bassey also recorded it with the title Oh God How Much I Love You, on her album Keep the Music Playing in 1991.

Modugno was an actor in 44 movies (such as Appuntamento a Ischia), and was a film producer of two (Tutto è musica of 1963 was his own biographical production).

In the 1970, Modugno focused on more classic music genres and profiles, as a singer and as a musician, adapting poetry, acting on television and in lead singing roles of modern operas.

Final years 

In 1984, Modugno suffered a severe stroke and remained partially paralyzed; this forced him to abandon his artistic career and devote himself to rehab.

From 1986, he worked for the rights of disabled people, and in June 1987, he was elected congressman for Turin in Italian Parliament, in the ranks of the Radical Party, a liberal-social political group. In the past he had supported the campaigns of the Italian Socialist Party and one for divorce, in addition to criticizing the human rights' violation by the regime of Augusto Pinochet, that cost him a denial of entry in Chile, where he had been scheduled to hold a concert. In this last stage of his life, instead, he was very active in social issues, fighting against inhuman conditions of patients in the Agrigento psychiatric hospital.

Modugno returned on the music scene, definitively (he already held a concert for former inmates of Agrigento's mental asylum, in 1989), in 1992–1993. His last song was Delfini (Dolphins), in 1993 with his son, Massimo.

On 6 August 1994, Modugno died at the age of 66, from a heart attack, on the island of Lampedusa, south of Sicily, while he was in his home by the sea. His beach-villa was put up for sale in 2020. It is located on Rabbits' Islet beach, the location is part of a natural protected reserve with limestones and crags.

Final resting/Burial - Cimitero Flaminio - Rome, Città Metropolitana di Roma Capitale, Lazio, Italy
FindAGrave Memorial Page 12552826

Discography 

 "Lu pisce spada"
 "Lazzarella"
 "Nel blu dipinto di blu" – also known as "Volare" (Sanremo winner song, 1958), co-authored with Franco Migliacci
 Buon Natale A Tutto Il Mondo (1958, with Ennio Morricone)
 "La lontananza"
 "Piove" – also known as "Ciao, ciao bambina" (Sanremo winner song, 1959)
 "Sopra i tetti azzurri del mio pazzo amore"
 "Vecchio frac"
 "Non piangere Maria"
 "Amara terra mia"
 "Stasera pago io"
 "Il maestro di violino"
 "Tu si 'na cosa grande"
 "Questa è la mia vita"
 "Addio...addio..."
 "Piange... il telefono"

Sanremo Festival 

Modugno was the winner four times (in 1958, 1959, 1962 and 1966).
 1956 "Musetto"
 1958 "Nel blu dipinto di blu" (winner)
 1959 "Piove (Ciao, ciao bambina)" (winner)
 1960 "Libero" (second place)
 1962 "Addio... addio..." (winner)
 1964 "Che me ne importa a me" (second place)
 1966 "Dio, come ti amo" (winner)
 1967 "Sopra i tetti azzurri del mio pazzo amore"
 1968 "Il posto mio"
 1971 "Come stai?"
 1972 "Un calcio alla città"
 1974 "Questa è la mia vita" (second place)

References

External links 
Official website 

1928 births
1994 deaths
People from Polignano a Mare
Radical Party (Italy) politicians
Federation of the Greens politicians
Deputies of Legislature X of Italy
Senators of Legislature X of Italy
Politicians of Apulia
Italian male singers
Italian pop singers
Italian  male singer-songwriters
Jubilee Records artists
RCA Victor artists
Decca Records artists
Italian human rights activists
20th-century Italian  male singers
Centro Sperimentale di Cinematografia alumni
Eurovision Song Contest entrants for Italy
Eurovision Song Contest entrants of 1958
Eurovision Song Contest entrants of 1959
Eurovision Song Contest entrants of 1966
Grammy Award winners
Sanremo Music Festival winners
Burials at the Cimitero Flaminio